David Griffith may refer to:

D. W. Griffith (1875–1948), film director
David Griffith (Clwydfardd) (1800–1894), Welsh poet and Archdruid
David Griffith (artist), artist whose work has appeared in role-playing games
David Griffith (bobsleigh), British Olympic bobsledder
David Griffith (comics), a character appearing in Marvel Comics

See also
 David Griffiths (disambiguation)